The 1963-64 French Rugby Union Championship was contested by 56 teams in 7 pools.

The four first teams of each pool and the best four placed 5th qualified for the last 32.

Pau won the championship after beating Béziers in the final.

It was the third time Pau had won the championship.

Qualification round 

Teams in bold qualified for the next round

"Last 32" 

Teams in bold qualified for the next round

Brive, the best placed team in the qualification round, was eliminated by Pau, the worst placed team to become the French Champions.

"Last 16" 

Teams in bold qualified for the quarterfinals

Quarterfinals 

Teams in bold qualified for the semifinals

Semifinals

Final

External links 
 Compte rendu finale de 1964 lnr.fr
 Finale 1964 finalesrugby.com

1964
France 1964
Championship